Venusia ochrota is a moth in the family Geometridae first described by George Hampson in 1903. It is found in Nepal and China.

References

Moths described in 1903
Venusia (moth)